Denis Neves Rezende da Silva (born 22 April 1990), known as Denis Neves, is a Brazilian footballer who plays for Guarani as a left back

Career statistics

References

External links

1990 births
Living people
People from Pirassununga
Brazilian footballers
Association football defenders
Campeonato Brasileiro Série B players
Campeonato Brasileiro Série C players
Coritiba Foot Ball Club players
Botafogo Futebol Clube (SP) players
Guarani FC players
Footballers from São Paulo (state)